The 'Summerfree' is an apple cultivar first developed in Italy in the 1990s by crossing 'PRI 1956-6' and 'Ed Gould Golden' apples.
Resistant to apple scab, it has a spreading habit with moderate vigor, the fruit are large with an average weight of 175 g, the skin is smooth, it ripens one to two months before 'Gala', and it has good storage ability.

References

External links
'Summerfree' profile
Picture

Apple cultivars